HCCH is the chemical formula for acetylene.

HCCH may also refer to:

HCC Insurance Holdings, an insurance company
Hague Conference on Private International Law